Finnish Squash Association ("Suomen Squashliitto" in Finnish) is the National Organisation for Squash in Finland.

External links
 Official site

See also
 Finland men's national squash team

Squash in Finland
National members of the World Squash Federation
Squash